Aleksandrów may refer to the following places in Poland:

Kuyavian-Pomeranian Voivodeship (north-central Poland)
Aleksandrów County
Aleksandrów Kujawski, town, the seat of Aleskandrów County

Łódź Voivodeship (central Poland)
Aleksandrów Łódzki

Lublin Voivodeship (east Poland)
Aleksandrów, Biłgoraj County
Aleksandrów, Kraśnik County
Aleksandrów, Gmina Łuków 
Aleksandrów, Gmina Stanin

Łódź Voivodeship (central Poland)
Aleksandrów, Bełchatów County
Aleksandrów, Gmina Strzelce 
Aleksandrów, Gmina Żychlin
Aleksandrów, Piotrków County 
Aleksandrów, Radomsko County 
Aleksandrów, Rawa County 
Aleksandrów, Tomaszów Mazowiecki County

Świętokrzyskie Voivodeship (south-central Poland)
Aleksandrów, Jędrzejów County
Aleksandrów, Pińczów County

Masovian Voivodeship (east-central Poland)
Aleksandrów, Garwolin County
Aleksandrów, Gostynin County
Aleksandrów, Grójec County
Aleksandrów, Kozienice County
Aleksandrów, Legionowo County
Aleksandrów, Lipsko County
Aleksandrów, Mińsk County
Aleksandrów, Piaseczno County
Aleksandrów, Gmina Iłów
Aleksandrów, Gmina Rybno
Aleksandrów, Szydłowiec County
Aleksandrów, Żyrardów County
Aleksandrów, Nowy Dwór Mazowiecki County
Aleksandrów, Radom County

Greater Poland Voivodeship (west-central Poland)
Aleksandrów, Kalisz County
Aleksandrów, Koło County
Aleksandrów, Środa Wielkopolska County
Aleksandrów, Turek County

Silesian Voivodeship (south Poland)
Aleksandrów, Częstochowa County 
Aleksandrów (sołectwo Wąsosz) 
Aleksandrów, Kłobuck County

Opole Voivodeship (south-west Poland)
Aleksandrów, Opole Voivodeship

See also
Gmina Aleksandrów (disambiguation)
Gmina Aleksandrów Kujawski
Gmina Aleksandrów Łódzki